Martfű is a town in Jász-Nagykun-Szolnok county, in the Northern Great Plain region of central Hungary.

Industry 
The town is dominated by light industry, including the following:

 Tisza Shoe Factory: Though designed prior to the outbreak of war, only in 1941-42 a factory was established by the Czechoslovak businessman Jan Antonin Bata, whose organization was based in Zlín, Czech Republic. The resulting factory complex and industrial town was built in Martfű, Hungary. The Hungarian shoe company called Cikta. During the decades of the Kádár era Tisza Cipő became the country's largest shoe manufacturer.
 Brewery: 1985, built by the surrounding businesses.
 Vegetable Oil Factory: built between 1976 and 1980. Primarily grown in the Great Plains sunflower, canola and soybean processing is carried out.
 Tisza Ipartelep plants: various industrial plants in the industrial and service center.

Martfű Monster 
The town is infamous for serial killer Péter Kovács who is known as Martfű Monster.

International relations
Martfű is twinned with:

 Tuchów, Poland; since 1999
 Tăuții-Măgherăuș (Misztótfalu), Romania; since 2006

Gallery

Geography

References

External links

  in Hungarian and English

Populated places in Jász-Nagykun-Szolnok County